Governor Taylor may refer to:

Alfred A. Taylor (1848–1931), 34th Governor of Tennessee
David G. P. Taylor (1933–2007), Governor of Montserrat from 1990 to 1993
Duncan Taylor (diplomat) (born 1958), Governor of the Cayman Islands from 2010 to 2013
James Braid Taylor (1891–1943), 2nd Governor of the Reserve Bank of India
John Taylor (South Carolina governor) (1770–1832), 51st Governor of South Carolina
Leon Rutherford Taylor (1883–1924), Acting Governor of New Jersey from 1913 to 1914
Robert Love Taylor (1850–1912), 24th Governor of Tennessee, brother of Alfred A. Taylor
William Robert Taylor (1820–1909), 12th Governor of Wisconsin
William S. Taylor (Kentucky politician) (1853–1928), 33rd Governor of Kentucky

See also
William Tailer (1676–1732), Acting Governor of the Province of Massachusetts Bay from 1715 to 1716
John Tayler (1742–1829), Acting 5th Governor of New York in 1817